Lee Daniel Crocker (born July 3, 1963) is an American computer programmer. He is best known for rewriting the software upon which Wikipedia runs, to address scalability problems. This software, originally known as "Phase III", went live in July 2002 and became the foundation of what is now called MediaWiki. MediaWiki's code repository was still named "phase3" until the move from Subversion to Git in March 2012.

He is a co-author of the PNG specification, and was also involved in the creation of the GIF and JPEG image file formats. He invented the per-scanline variable pre-filtering compression method used by PNG, the sum-of-abs heuristic used by many encoding programs, and proposed an early version of the Adam7 algorithm, using 5 passes rather than 7. In 1998, he was one of the 23 original creators of the "Transhumanist Declaration". As of 1999, he was a member of the Extropians futurist society.

In June 2010, Crocker was among those recognized by the Software Tools Users Group (STUG) as a major contributor to MediaWiki when they awarded MediaWiki and the Wikimedia Foundation the USENIX Advanced Computing Technical Association STUG award for "the largest collaboratively edited reference projects in the world, including Wikipedia".

See also
 List of Wikipedia people

References

External links

 
 Information Week May 7, 2007: The Best Web Software Ever Written
 San Diego Union-Tribune December 6, 2004: Everyone's Encyclopedia
 Dr. Dobb's Journal #232 July 1995 (Vol 20, Issue 7), pp. 36–44: PNG: The Portable Network Graphic Format

1963 births
Living people
American transhumanists
Extropians
Free software programmers
American software engineers
American Wikimedians
Wikipedia people